Strictly convex may refer to:
 Strictly convex function, a function having the line between any two points above its graph
 Strictly convex polygon, a polygon enclosing a strictly convex set of points
 Strictly convex set, a set whose interior contains the line between any two points
 Strictly convex space, a normed vector space for which the closed unit ball is a strictly convex set